Hurricane Ismael was responsible for significant flooding throughout the Inland Empire of the United States in August 1983. The cyclone was the tenth depression, ninth named storm, and fifth hurricane of the 1983 Pacific hurricane season. The origins of Hurricane Ismael were from a northward bulge of the Intertropical Convergence Zone (ITCZ) in early August, which resulted in the formation of a tropical depression on August 8. Six hours later, it was upgraded into Tropical storm Ismael. Continuing to intensify, Ismael was upgraded into a hurricane late on August 10 and subsequently developed an eye. Late on August 11, Hurricane Ismael began to weaken as it encountered cooler waters. The following day, Ismael was downgraded into a tropical storm. After turning north, Ismael dissipated later that day near Guadalupe Island.

While still out at sea, Ismael brought  waves to Southern California, though waves from the storm were less than expected. One person was swept away at a beach. The remnants of the storm later moved over the region, resulting in moderate rainfall. The Yucca Valley was the worst hit by the storm, where nearly every road was washed out. Almost 50,000 residents were isolated due to rains. A tornado was spotted near Los Angeles, causing minor damage. In San Bernardino, many buildings were destroyed. Around 80,000 homes were left without power across the Inland Empire. Moreover, three interstates were closed. In all, minor injuries were reported, three people died in San Bernardino when their car swept into a channel, and an engineer was killed returning to China Lake when her car was swept into a wash. Damage in the region totaled $19 million (1983 USD). After affecting California, the remnants of the hurricane moved into Nevada. Many parking lots in Laughlin were flooded; two small towns in Clark County were also isolated. Furthermore, several major streets along the outskirts of Las Vegas were closed because of flooding.

Meteorological history

Hurricane Ismael originated from a northward bulge of the ITCZ in early August. Late on August 8, the system was upgraded into a tropical depression. Initially, the storm was expected to turn west and remain at sea; however, the depression turned northwest instead. Six hours after becoming a tropical cyclone, the low was upgraded into Tropical Storm Ismael.

After remaining a marginal tropical storm for 18 hours, Ismael began to deepen and by August 10, it was approaching hurricane intensity. By this time, the storm was forecast to accelerate and approach Guadalupe Island in three days. At 1800 UTC on August 10, Ismael was upgraded into a hurricane. At 0245 UTC the next day, an eye began to form as the system passed east of the outer Revillagigedo Islands. Sandwiched between a ridge to the west of the hurricane and a trough off the coast of California, Ismael turned west-northwest and accelerated.

Late on August 11, Hurricane Ismael began to weaken as it encountered cooler waters. According to the EPHC, the storm was downgraded to a Category 1 on the SSHWS late on August 11. On August 13, Hurricane Hunters flew through the storm, penetrating the center of circulation twice. During its first penetration, the aircraft reported winds of  just east of the center and also noted that the weakening system had a poorly defined eye. After turning north and entering even cooler waters, the storm made landfall on Guadalupe.

Impact

California

While still out at sea, Ismael brought rough seas that lead to one home on the Capistrano Beach being ruled unsafe. In Malibu, one home was damaged due to the increased surf. In Laguna Beach, in southern Orange County, a 20-year-old woman was swept off rocks and later died. Overall, Hurricane Ismael was one of six tropical cyclones to bring high waves to the state within a span of a month.

On August 11, the outer rainbands of Hurricane Ismael brought unseasonably high humidity and thunderstorms to Southern California. Subsequently, flash flood watches were posted for much of Southern California. The remnants of the storm eventually moved over the area, resulting in significant flooding. The towns of Joshua Tree, Yucca Valley, Twentynine Palms, California, and Landers were the hardest hit. Nearly every road was washed out in the Yucca Valley.

Almost 50,000 residents in Palm Springs were isolated due to brief, but heavy rains. In addition, a tornado damaged two homes and over seven chimneys near Los Angeles. Heavy rains also drenched the cities of Riverside and San Bernardino while flooding several homes. In the latter, many buildings were destroyed, forcing widespread evacuations. In Rancho Mirage, 24 homes were damaged. Around 80,000 homes were left without power across the Inland Empire, though within 24 hours after the outage, power was restored to all but 4,000 residents. Moreover, portions of Interstate 10, Interstate 15, and 215 were closed. The highway the lead into Palm Springs was closed as well, resulting in major traffic jams. In all, minor injuries were reported. However, three people died in San Bernardino when their car swept into a channel. Damage from the storm totaled $19 million (1983 USD).

Nevada
Heavy rains that preceded the storm forced thousands of gamblers along the Las Vegas Strip to be evacuated and left two people missing. The remnants of the storm later moved into the region, bringing additional flooding. Many parking lots in the resort town of Laughlin were flooded. Furthermore, the villages of Searchlight and Blue Diamond were isolated due to flooding. Several major streets in Paradise were closed because of flooding and sandbag barriers were erected alongside Caesars Palace to prevent further flood damage. In addition, record river levels were measured along the Amargosa River near Death Valley.

Elsewhere
In the Mexican states of Baja California and Baja California Sur, the storm brought high clouds over the region for several days. In Ensenada, minor flooding was recorded.

Residents of Davis County, Utah that were in close proximity of streams were put on alert due to the threat of flooding. The remnants of Hurricane Ismael ultimately brought thunderstorms to Arizona and Utah. Further south and west, in Phoenix, a thunderstorm flooded streets and brought down power lines.

See also

List of Baja California hurricanes
List of California hurricanes
Hurricane Darby (1992)
Hurricane Liza (1968)
Hurricane Ramon
Hurricane Marie (2014) – Brought similarly high surf to California, but unlike Ismael, no rain.
Hurricane Dolores (2015) – Took a similar track to Ismael, and also brought heavy rain to Southern California.

References

Ismael (1983)
1983 natural disasters in the United States
1983 in California
Ismael (1983)
Ismael (1983)
Ismael